
Poddębice County is a unit of territorial administration and local government (powiat) in Łódź Voivodeship, central Poland. It came into being on January 1, 1999, as a result of the Polish local government reforms passed in 1998.

As of 2006 its total population is 42,195, out of which the population of Poddębice is 7,875, that of Uniejów is 2,916, and the rural population is 31,404.

Neighbouring counties
Poddębice County is bordered by Łęczyca County to the north-east, Zgierz County to the east, Pabianice County to the south-east, Łask County, Zduńska Wola County and Sieradz County to the south, Turek County to the west, and Koło County to the north-west.

Administrative division
The county is subdivided into six gminas (two urban-rural and four rural). These are listed in the following table, in descending order of population.

References
Polish official population figures 2006

 
Land counties of Łódź Voivodeship